The Act 6 Geo 4 c 16, sometimes called the Bankruptcy Act 1825, the Bankrupt Act, the Bankrupts Act 1825 or the Bankrupts England Act 1825, was an Act of the Parliament of the United Kingdom. It was repealed by section 1 of, and Schedule A to, the Bankrupt Law Consolidation Act 1849 (12 & 13 Vict c 106). It was repealed for the Republic of Ireland by section 2(1) and 3 of, and Part 4 of Schedule 2 to, the Statute Law Revision Act 2007.

The Act allowed people to start proceedings for their own bankruptcy. Before this, only creditors could start the proceedings.

See also
UK insolvency law
UK bankruptcy law
History of bankruptcy law

Notes and references
The Statutes of the United Kingdom of Great Britain and Ireland, 6 George IV. 1825. Printed by His Majesty's Statute and Law Printers. 1825. Page 46.
John Raithby. The Statutes of the United Kingdom of Great Britain and Ireland. 1826. Volume 10. Page 24.
Charles Sturgeon. The Bankrupt Act, 6 G. 4. c. 16; and the Bankrupt Court Act, 1 & 2 Wm. 4. c. 56. Second Edition. Saunders and Benning. London. 1832. Google Books.
Charles Sturgeon. The Bankrupt Act, 6 Geo. IV., Cap. 16, with All the Recent Decisions at Common Law and in Equity, the Orders in Chancery, and Abstracts from Other Statutes Relating to Bankruptcy. Saunders and Benning. London. 1830. Google Books.
Francis Gregg. The New Bankrupt Act; 6 Geo. IV. Chap. 16, Fully Explained, with Practical Notes. Printed by A Strahan for Joseph Butterworth and Son. London. 1826. Google Books.
A R Warrand. The New Bankrupt Act, 6 Geo. IV. c. 16. 1826. See "Law Books Recently Published by R Pheney" in the supplement to this work, Catalogue of Modern Law Books.
W J Impey. The Bankrupt Act, 6 Geo. IV. Cap. 16.
Francis Ludlow Holt. The Bankrupt Laws, as Established by the New Act, 6 Geo. IV. c. 16. Joseph Butterworth and Son. London. 1827. Google Books.
Robert Henley Eden. A Practical Treatise on the Bankrupt Law: As Amended by the New Act of the 6 Geo. IV. c. 16. Second Edition. Printed for Joseph Butterworth and Son. London. 1826. Google Books.

Insolvency law of the United Kingdom
United Kingdom Acts of Parliament 1825